Armen John Chakmakian (Western Armenian: Արմէն Չագմագեան; Eastern ) born (February 11, 1966) in Glendale, California) is an Armenian-American musician, composer, recording artist, and producer. Formerly the keyboardist for the GRAMMY® award-winning band Shadowfax, their 1992 CD, Esperanto was nominated for a Best New Age Album GRAMMY® Award. He has released two solo albums on his label TruArt Records: Ceremonies (1998); Caravans (2004). Two tracks from Ceremonies, "Gypsy Rain" and "Distant Lands", also appear on the famed "Buddha Bar" and "Buddha Bar IV" compilation albums, respectively.

Armen's albums also feature world-renowned oud player, violinist and composer John Bilezikjian, duduk master Djivan Gasparyan and former Windham Hill acoustic guitarist Alex De Grassi.  In 2006 Armen toured South America with Cirque du Soleil's show, Saltimbanco and in 2017 he toured South America again as keyboardist and background vocalist with Roger Hodgson.

Currently, he composes music for television, performs his own concerts as well as performs for other artists and productions.

Discography
1998 Ceremonies (TruArt Records)
2004 Caravans (TruArt Records)

With Chuck Greenberg
2018 Into The Blue (single, Greenberg Music)

With Shadowfax
1992 Esperanto (EarthBeat Records)
1994 Magic Theater (EarthBeat Records)
1995 Shadowfax Live (Sonic Images)

See also
List of Armenian-Americans

References

External links
 Armen Chakmakian Official website
 IMDb Page

Living people
Year of birth missing (living people)
American people of Armenian descent
Musicians from California
American jazz keyboardists
Shadowfax (band) members
Musicians from Glendale, California
Jazz musicians from California